Rönnäng is a locality situated in Tjörn Municipality, Västra Götaland County, Sweden with 1,437 inhabitants in 2010. It lies on the south peak of the island Tjörn in Sweden.

References

External links 
 Rönnängs skola (The school)
 Rönnängs bibliotek (The library)
 Rönnängs FF (Soccer club, unofficial page)

Populated places in Västra Götaland County
Populated places in Tjörn Municipality